W2K16 may refer to:

Video games
 WWE 2K16, a professional wrestling video game created by Yuke's and Visual Concepts.

Technology
 Windows Server 2016, an operating system released by Microsoft.